Keratosis obturans is a relatively uncommon ear disease, where dense plug of keratin is present in the deep meatus of the ear. It is clinically diagnosed when removal of the debris shows silvery white peripheral matrix and causes excruciating pain.

Discovery
Keratosis obturans was first properly described by Wreden of St. Petersburg in 1874, who differentiated this condition from impacted wax. Peipergedes and Behnke were the first to define the distinctions between the two.

Signs and symptoms
The most common symptoms are hearing loss and severe pain secondary to the accumulation of keratin in the ear canal. Keratosis obturans has been classified into four grades depending on the severity of symptoms:

Diagnosis
The diagnosis of keratosis obturans is clinical. Differentiation between keratosis obturans and impacted wax is difficult at first presentation. It is diagnosed only when attempted removal of the substance causes excruciating pain, and shows silvery white peripheral matrix. When the matrix is peeled, new capillaries that were formed within the matrix rupture, resulting in bleeding. It is possible that these new capillaries are formed as a result of inflammation of the surrounding bony canal.

Treatment
Canaloplasty, where the ear canal is widened using grafts, was first proposed as the treatment for keratois obturans. However, with the migration of keratin within the canal, any amount of widening could not restore the migration of skin. Reconstruction of the bony canal with cartilage graft from temporalis fascia has showed some results.
But firstly preferred is cleaning with 1 percent acetic acid.

References

Diseases of the ear and mastoid process